Balistreri is a surname. Notable people with the surname include:

Frank Balistreri, American businessman
John Balistreri (born 1962), American ceramic artist
Pietro Balistreri (born 1986), American football player
Rosa Balistreri (1927–1990), Italian singer